Haqq ( ḥaqq) is the Arabic word for truth. In Islamic contexts, it is also interpreted as right and reality. Al-Haqq, 'the truth, is one of the names of God in the Qur'an. It is often used to refer to God as the Ultimate Reality in Islam.

See also
 Abdul Haq (disambiguation)
 Al-Haq, the Palestinian human rights organization
 Allahu Haqq
 Haqiqa
 Haqq (surname)
 Names of God in Islam

Haqq
Truth